Alexei Fedorovich Pakhomov ( – 14 April 1973) was a Russian avant-garde painter. He is widely renowned as a master of lithography. Early in his career, he was a successful illustrator for children's books. His work during World War II earned him the State Stalin Prize. He later became a professor of art and was named a People's Artist of the USSR.

Life

Early life 
Pakhomov was born into a peasant family in a small village. Pakhomov's father was elected as village head, meaning Alexei had access to paper and began to draw as a hobby. People came to see his drawings, and soon a local landlord named Zubov invited him to visit. During those visits, Zubov gave him drawing paper and crayons and showed him the works of Surikov and Repin. When Pakhomov finished primary education at the village school, Zubov arranged for Alexei to go to high school in Kadnikov.

Training

In 1915, Zubov's father, former actor Yuri Zubov, collected money for Pakhomov to study in Petrograd at the Stieglitz Art School, where his teachers were N. Shukhaev, Sergey Chekhonin, Mstislav Dobuzhinsky, and Alexander Savinov. He remained there until 1917. From 1921, the young artist studied at the Vkhutemas under V. Lebedev, N. Tyrsa, and A. Karev.

Due to the October Revolution and the Russian civil war, Pakhomov's studies were drawn out until 1925, when he graduated from Vkhutemas. In 1921–1923, he joined the Circle of Artists movement.

Death 
Pakhomov died 14 April 1973.

Career

Children's book illustrations
Though Pakhomov made several colorful, monumental easel paintings, he was first and foremost a graphic artist, renowned for his huge contribution to the illustration of children's books. The warm glow of his idyllic childhood years found its way into images of peasant children, whose simple lives he depicted with masterful ease. In the 1920s, he made trips to Young Pioneer summer camps to study children and their special plasticity and expression in natural surroundings. Soviet illustrators virtually revolutionized the approach to children's book illustration. The images of the past were replaced with dynamic, colorful, and emotional pictures that lived in the text instead of accompanying them. At the same time, fonts and covers were also reconsidered and redesigned.

Pakhomov co-founded the Artists' Society in 1926. He participated in all of the society's exhibitions until 1931. Pakhomov's work reached Japan in 1927, when his work was put up at an exhibition of Soviet art in Osaka. Shortly after that, he began working with the magazines Chizh and Ezh. He also made illustrations for E. L. Schwartz's, S. Marshak's, and G. Krutov's children's books.

Response to criticism
In the first half of the 1930s, Pakhomov found himself in a difficult situation given the narrowing official view of art and the Soviet campaign against "formalism". His paintings, in which half-naked, young men and women tan in the sun, were the object of severe criticism. The artist had to choose whether to give up his professional principles or some parts of his art. He chose the latter, concentrating on graphic work and limiting himself even more by almost completely giving up color in his illustrations.

World War II
When Nazi Germany invaded the Soviet Union during Operation Barbarossa, there was a need for propaganda placards and posters calling citizens to aid the war effort. Pakhomov hurried to Leningrad to do what he could to help. In July 1941, he helped dig anti-tank moats at Moloskovitza station. During the next three years, Pakhomov remained in besieged Leningrad. Between 1942 and 1944, he produced a series of lithographs, Leningrad in the Days of the Blockade, in which he strove to bring forward the very real emotion of the siege of Leningrad: the uniqueness of this particular setting of place and time and the consequent human suffering and strength of spirit. The series earned him the State Stalin Prize in 1946. During the siege, his workshop was hit by a bomb that came through the roof, smashed through the floor, and blew up two floors below, destroying some of his works.

The Russian Institute of Blood Transfusions asked him to cooperate, where he met Vladimir Konashevich, V. Dvorakovsky, and Dmitry Mitrokhin. He received a poster-making order from V. Serov, who was chairman of the Leningrad Union of Artists at the time.

Postwar work

Between 1944 and 1947, Pakhomov worked on the series In Our City, in which the artist strove to reflect the grand scale of the postwar effort to rebuild ruined Leningrad and to reinstate its formerly vibrant life. The presence of female workers in every traditionally male trade is a reminder of the recent war, which killed millions of Russians. In 1948, he began teaching at the Il’ya Repin Institute of Painting, Sculpture, and Architecture; he became a professor the following year.

In the final period of his work, in the 1950s and 1960s, Pakhomov tried to revive his work after it became a bit too dry, perhaps too influenced by the strongly dogmatic requirements of post-war Russia. In the 1960s, he even returned to the use of color, but his work during this period did not gain much critical acclaim.

See also 
 Fine Art of Leningrad

External links
 Pakhomov info
 Aleksei Pakhomov in The Great Soviet Encyclopedia (1979)

References

1900 births
1973 deaths
People from Vologda Oblast
People from Kadnikovsky Uyezd
Russian avant-garde
20th-century Russian painters
Russian male painters
Stalin Prize winners
Recipients of the USSR State Prize
Burials at Bogoslovskoe Cemetery